Soner Arıca (born 5 February 1966) is a Turkish singer and record producer.

Biography

He was born as the youngest of seven children in the Fatsa district of Ordu Province, Turkey. Later, he moved to Istanbul and studied in Şişli College. Having graduated from the college, he continued his education and obtained a degree in economics from Marmara University. In 1986, he became a professional model. He had a modelling career for five years. In 1992, he released his first album.

Albums 

 Bir Umut, (1992)
 En Güzel Serüven, (1994)
 Yaşıyorum, (1995)
 Yalvarma (Maxi Single), (1996) 
 Herşey Yolunda, (1997)
 Sen Mutlu Ol (Maxi Single), (1998) 
 Şarkılar Var, (1999) 
 Kusursuz Aşk, (2001)
 Remix, (2002) 
 Aşkla Oldu – Best Of Soner Arıca, (2003)
 Hatıram Olsun, (2004) 
 Benim Adım Aşk, (2005) 
 Dance Remix, (2006)
 Bu Yaz Biz, (2006)
 Seni Seviyorum, (2007)
 İyisi Geliyor, (2014)
 Yapboz, (2015)
 Saklı, (2016)

References

 Biyografi.info – Biography of Soner Arıca

External links 
 Official website

1966 births
Living people
People from Fatsa
Turkish male singers
Turkish pop singers
Turkish record producers
Marmara University alumni